Jonny King (Jonathan Z. King, born 2 February 1965, New York City, New York) is an American jazz pianist, attorney, fisherman and writer.

Raised in New York City, King graduated from Princeton University and Harvard Law School and works as an intellectual property attorney.

As well as recording under his own name, he has performed with Eddie Harris, Vincent Herring, Christian McBride, OTB, Joshua Redman, Mark Turner, and Steve Wilson. He has performed around the world and is a regular in New York City's jazz clubs. He is the author of What Jazz Is (Walker Publishing), a primer on jazz listening published in conjunction with a CD prepared by Blue Note Records.

King is also a fly tyer and fisherman. He is a member of the "Pro Team" for Tuffleye and has hosted tying classes and demonstrations. King is credited for creating his own variation of the Muddler Minnow pattern he named the "Kinky Muddler" and written numerous articles on the topic for magazines such as Fly Fisherman  and Salt Water Sportsman.

Discography
 1994: In from the Cold (Criss Cross) with Vincent Herring, Mark Turner, Ira Coleman, Billy Drummond
 1996: Notes from the Underground (Enja) with Joshua Redman, Steve Nelson, Peter Washington
 1997: The Meltdown (Enja) with Larry Grenadier, Milton Cardona, David Sanchez, Steve Wilson, Steve Davis
 2012: Above All (Sunnyside) with Ed Howard and Victor Lewis

References

1965 births
Living people
American jazz pianists
American male pianists
Enja Records artists
Criss Cross Jazz artists
Harvard Law School alumni
Princeton University alumni
20th-century American pianists
21st-century American pianists
20th-century American male musicians
21st-century American male musicians
American male jazz musicians
Sunnyside Records artists